Jaclyn Michelle Betham is a Samoan American actress and ballet dancer.  She is best known for her role as Amanda Cryer on the television series The Haves and the Have Nots.

Early life
Betham was born in Long Beach, California and is of Samoan descent. As a child, Betham was a gymnast before she began ballet dancing at age 12. She trained with Ballet San Jose before receiving a full scholarship into the Houston Ballet at age 15. Betham went on to perform with Ballet San Jose, Anaheim Ballet, Opera San Jose, and the San Francisco Opera. She won a gold medal at Grand Prix Italia when she was 18.

Career
After three years performing with Houston Ballet, Betham worked as an instructor for Ballet San Jose before moving to Los Angeles to pursue acting. Her first acting role was playing a kidnapped girl on America's Most Wanted. She starred in the popular 2012 short Quiet, a film based on the true story of a lesbian couple caught in a medical nightmare. In 2013, Betham's first major acting role came when she was cast as Amanda Cryer in the Tyler Perry television series The Haves and the Have Nots. In 2020, she made her debut as a writer and producer on the film Getaway.

Personal life
Betham teaches ballet and is the founder of a nonprofit organization called Betham Ballet Theatre.

Filmography

Film

Television

References

External links

Living people
American television actresses
American film actresses
American ballerinas
American people of Samoan descent
Actresses of Samoan descent
21st-century American actresses
Year of birth missing (living people)